Honey Brook is both a borough and a township in Chester County, Pennsylvania.

Honey Brook, Pennsylvania
Honey Brook Township, Pennsylvania